Balma Sporting Club is a football club founded located in Balma, France. Founded in 1947, they play their home matches at the Stade Municipal de Balma, which has a capacity of 4,000. As of the 2021–22 season, they play in the Championnat National 3, the fifth tier of French football.

Current squad

References

Sport in Haute-Garonne
1947 establishments in France
Association football clubs established in 1947
Football clubs in Occitania (administrative region)